Signature School is a charter high school located in downtown Evansville, Indiana on the Main Street walkway. The school opened in 2002 as Indiana's first public charter high school. It has been consistently ranked, by a number of publications, as one of the top high schools in the United States.

History 
Signature School began in 1992 as a half-day program with 213 students. It offered both morning and afternoon classes and allowed motivated high school students to enroll in higher-level courses. In particular, the Accelerated, Compacted, Enriched Program (ACE) was developed for freshmen and sophomores who seek advanced English, foreign language, math, and science offerings.

By 2001, Signature School had 278 part-time students. After the passage of the Indiana Charter School Law, the staff applied for a full-day program, adopted more courses into the curriculum, and changed the school to a charter school. In December 2001, Signature School submitted a charter-seeking conversion status to the Evansville Vanderburgh School Corporation (EVSC), and on February 25, 2002, EVSC approved the charter – making the school Indiana's first public charter high school.

The first graduation ceremony for Signature School students was held in May 2003 in the Victory Theatre. The first graduating class consisted of 42 students.

Profile
Signature School is part of the International Baccalaureate (IB) Programme. Many classes offer a combination of both AP and IB credits. Foreign languages offered at the school include French, German, and Spanish.

The student-to-teacher ratio is 20 to 1. Students and parents can access grades and other information from a server called PowerSchool.

Community service is a part of the mission of Signature School. All students are required to perform more than 100 hours of service to their school, local, and global communities. The class of 2021 logged 9367 hours in four years.

Rankings
In 2017, the Washington Post named Signature “the third most challenging high school in the U.S.". U.S. News & World Report ranked the school the 21st best public high school in the U.S., the sixth best charter, and number one school in the Midwest in 2013. The Daily Beast named Signature the 5th best high school in America in its list entitled "Top High Schools 2014". In addition, Signature School has been declared a Blue Ribbon School.

In 2010 and 2011, Newsweek ranked the school as the seventh best in the United States. In 2011, the Washington Post ranked the school the eighth best in the United States. Out of about 22,000 high schools nationwide, U.S. News & World Report ranked the school the 53rd best in 2011.

Previous Newsweek rankings have declared Signature 54th (2006), 99th (2008), 27th (2009), 7th (2010), and 7th (2011). Other Washington Post rankings of the school include 126th (2007), 97th (2008), 23rd (2009), 7th (2010), and 8th (2011).

In 2020, Signature was named the #1 Most Challenging School in the Nation according to the Jay Mathews Challenge Index.

Campus
Signature School is located in several buildings in downtown Evansville, Indiana on the Main Street walkway. These include the fourth floor of the Victory Theatre; the Robert L. Koch II Science Building, which is attached to the Gerling Law Firm offices; the YMCA (for PE classes); and the Browning Rooms at Central Library. The school's main building is attached to the Victory Theatre. The building now known as Signature School was originally a hotel, later gutted and remodeled to serve as a school.

In 2015, Signature School received $2.5 million in funding for the building of the new science center as part of the Regional Cities Initiative. The Regional Cities Initiative aims to help communities across Indiana transform their regions into nationally recognized destinations to live, work, and play.

References

External links
 Signature School

 

Schools in Evansville, Indiana
Public high schools in Indiana
High schools in Southwestern Indiana
IHSAA Conference-Independent Schools
Charter schools in Indiana
Educational institutions established in 1992
1992 establishments in Indiana